Bockhorn is a municipality in the district of Friesland, in Lower Saxony, Germany. It is approximately 15 km southwest of Wilhelmshaven, and 30 km northwest of Oldenburg.

Persons from Bockhorn 
 Diedrich Uhlhorn (1764-1832), inventor
 Ludwig von Weltzien (1815-1870), prussian lieutenant general

References

Friesland (district)